The Bofors 152 mm kanon m/42 is a naval gun for use on ships. It was initially used aboard light cruisers and cruisers including the Swedish  and the Dutch , after World War II.

The 152 mm gun was first designed in 1939 by Bofors for the Koninklijke Marine cruiser Kijkduin, eventually named . After the German invasion of the Netherlands in 1940 these artillery pieces were confiscated by the Swedish Government and placed on the Swedish cruiser .

References

External links

 Tony DiGiulian, Netherlands 15 cm/53 (5.9") Sweden 15.2 cm/53 (6") Model 1942

Bofors
Naval guns of the Netherlands
Naval guns of Sweden
World War II naval weapons
Artillery of Sweden
152 mm artillery
Weapons and ammunition introduced in 1943